Enrique MacDonell, also spelled MacDonnell, was a Spanish admiral noted for his participation in several sea battles including the Battle of Trafalgar.

He was born in Pontevedra, Spain, into a prominent Irish-Spanish family, though his naval records state his origin as Irish. His father was a Spanish Army brigadier-general and colonel of the Irish Regiment of Irlanda, and his mother a lady-in-waiting to the royal household.

Spelling of surname
His surname is often incorrectly spelt MacDonell. It is actually signed MacDonnell in his letters and reports to the admiralty.

Irish family origins
In the Central Archive of the Spanish Armada he is listed as an Irish citizen. This is incorrect as his baptismal certificate proves he was born in Spain. Few details exist of his youth but his family had Irish origins and kept strong Irish connections. His grandfather was born in Dublin and his grandmother was from Cork, and they fled to Spain to escape from religious persecution in Ireland.

Army career
His immediate family had several generals in the Spanish Army and following that tradition he entered the Spanish Army to serve in his father's regiment the Regimento de Infantería de Ultonia in 1760 aged 7. In January 1764 he was made second lieutenant. MacDonnell was swiftly promoted to infantry lieutenant in 1769 and then advanced to the rank of captain in 1774, before requesting a transfer to the Spanish Navy. In 1775 he was named a Knight of the Order of Santiago.

Early naval career

MacDonnell had a distinguished career in the navy, that saw him travel extensively and saw him in command positions in several famous battles including the battles of Roatan and Trafalgar. He was injured on several occasions but enjoyed a steady progression up through the ranks from Sub-Lieutenant to Vice-Admiral.

In July 1776, he joined the Spanish Navy as a sub-lieutenant and was assigned to the frigate  as part of a mission against the Algerians in the squadron of Captain Felix de Tejada. In September, he was transferred within the squadron to the 34-gun frigate . In November Carmen and its support ships fought and burned two Ottoman Algeria xebecs in Melilla cove.

On 28 February 1777, he was promoted to lieutenant, and in April his next posting was lieutenant in command of the xebec  bound for Corsica in the Mediterranean Sea and the West Indies. During this time he was injured in a battle with a larger English ship before returning to Cadiz. MacDonnell was briefly assigned to the ships San Isidro and Andoluz in December 1778.

In February 1779, upon recovery from his injuries, he was posted to the 34-gun frigate . It was part of a six-ship squadron patrolling the Azores seeking a squadron of 4–5 English vessels traveling from South America. The Spanish never made this interception but on 11 September the squadron spotted a lone English ship off Terceira Island in the Azores.  Santa Maria Magdalena and another frigate gave chase, but the English ship escaped as nightfall arrived. The frigates became separated from the fleet and sailed back towards Spain alone. On 15 August 1779, Santa Maria Magdalena captured the British 10-gun privateer Duke Of Cornwall off Cape St Vincent by disguising the frigate as a merchant ship. The privateer surrendered after the first Spanish warning salvo.

MacDonnell was on board the 30-gun ship Andaluz as part of a convoy to Havana led by Don Jose De Solano transporting troops from the Regimento de Infantería de Hibernia to Cuba, arriving in August 1780.

In April 1781, he boarded the 74-gun ship , and participated in the Siege of Pensacola, where he went ashore with a detachment of marines and was wounded in action. Once recovered, on 4 August he was promoted and he received the command of the sloop , with the rank of commander (captain de frigata).

MacDonnell was one of the commanding officers in the March 1782 Battle of Roatán. He is recorded in Spanish Naval Gazettes as being in command of one of the frigates. Elsewhere, his role has been described as a dual role, as the second-in-command on the 40-gun  but also as captain of one of the accompanying frigates. When the British garrison refused to surrender, MacDonnell who spoke fluent English and French was chosen to row ashore to offer terms of surrender. They were rejected. The Spanish stormed the island and took control after a short but fierce battle. The British surrendered on 17 March and its garrison of 81 soldiers were taken on board the Spanish ships as prisoners. On 26 May, he took command of the sloop Santa Ana and transferred 400 soldiers from Trujillo, Colón, to the River Tinto in Honduras and other British settlements along that coast. This helped to take possession of them. He left Santa Ana and returned to Trujillo and was back on Santa Matilde. He moved to Havana and he took in command of the Andaluz and he was promoted to full captain on 23 June 1782.

In February 1783, he took command of the corvette . On 25 November, it left Havana en route to Spain.  On 4 December, it engaged in a fierce battle against a heavier-armed English privateer ship, north of Bermuda, sinking it. Diligencia travelled onwards to Cadiz, Spain.

He was in the admiralty in Madrid for first nine months of 1784 before taking brief command of the 74-gun  and sailing it to Ferrol to be decommissioned.

MacDonnell returned to Cadiz in July 1787 and was appointed to the position of port captain in autumn 1878 briefly, and reappointed from May 1788 to March 1789. Whilst based in Cadiz he applied to join for the Swedish Navy after firstly securing permission to do so from the  Spanish Navy.

Swedish Navy and return to Spain

During the summer of 1789 MacDonnell joined the Swedish Navy to take part in the Russo-Swedish War and was assigned command of the hemmema Oden with Måns von Rosenstein. During the 1789 Battle of Svensksund he had a ten-and-a-half-hour cannonade battle with several Russian ships. MacDonnell eventually surrendered after becoming surrounded by seven ships. Having already lost one-third of his crew and with only four cannon still operating, he was badly injured himself. He was taken a prisoner of war in St Petersburg. Upon his release he was awarded military honours by Gustav III of Sweden. He was reportedly offered the supreme command of the entire Swedish Navy with 35 ships and 20,000 sailors. He declined the position as a condition of his early release from Russia was that he would not go to war with Russia again. Correspondence with the King of Spain approved his decision to decline the offer. He did remain as a naval advisor to the king sitting on his war council.

In July 1791, he returned to Spain, taking command of the 68/64-gun  conducting operations off the coast of Morocco until December.

MacDonnell was captain of the 60-gun  from 5 May to 31 August 1793, and sailed with the a fleet of 24 ships under the command of Don Francisco De Borja, in the Campaign of Sardinia. The fleet succeeded in the Capture of San Pietro and Sant'Antioco islands. Heavily outnumbered the French garrison of 800 men and 400 sailors surrendered without a battle, and the 36-gun frigate  was captured. From August 1793 until January 1794, he was captain of the 74-gun , with Admiral De Borja's fleet.

On 25 January 1794, he was promoted to commodore. In August 1794, he was commodore of the 94-gun . Sailing from Cadiz it travelled to Havana and the Sea of the Antilles in the squadron of Amistizabal before leaving Havana in February 1795 with the ship  and both returning to Cadiz arriving in April 1795 laden with money, gold and goods.

In May 1795 he was commodore aboard the 80-gun . It was a short command and in February 1796 he passed command of San Nicholas de Bari to Commordore Tomas Geraldino, who later died on board during a battle with Horatio Nelson's ship  in the 1797 Battle of Cape St. Vincent. Geraldino and MacDonnell were colleagues while living in Cadiz.

He changed ship to Angel de la Guarda and returned to Havana. During this time he was brought before his superiors following a dispute with a lieutenant, Fernando Morillo. The case was dismissed and he once again returned to Spain in 1799. That year he was made a Commander de Palmoas en la Order Santiago.

Retirement and return
In 1800, MacDonnell was in Spain and the following year, he retired from the navy with the honorary use of his uniform and rank.

He wrote the Coordinated offensive plan of land and sea against the United States of America in 1804. In was submitted to Minister Dom Grandallana, returned apparently unread or uncommented upon. The plan submitted to the Spanish Admiralty for a full-scale war and invasion of the United States, involving naval and ground battles. Spain was becoming increasingly concerned at the growth of American power. The Third Coalition and the 1808 French destruction of the Spanish naval fleet saw this plan withdrawn.

In 1805 MacDonnell came out of retirement and rejoined the navy and fought at the Battle of Trafalgar commanding the 100-gun . After the battle he led a daring rescue mission of to recapture Spanish and France ships taken during the battle. This rescue freed four ships and 3,000 prisoners including Vice-Admiral Álava. This sortie also captured 150 English sailors and that enabled the Spanish and French to negotiate a prisoner swap days later. He was promoted to rear-admiral the following fortnight on 8 November.

Battle of Trafalgar

In 1804, Federico Carlos Gravina y Nápoli was short of experienced officers and MacDonnell volunteered to come out of retirement. Both men wrote to the Spanish admiralty at the same time seeking his reappointment. MacDonnell offered to take any rank the navy considered suitable but he was reinstated as commodore. Gravina appointed him commodore of Rayo.

Before the battle itself, a war council meeting of the fourteen leading Franco-Spanish admirals and commodores was held on Pierre-Charles Villeneuve's ship in Cadiz's port. MacDonnell, a French speaker, was chosen as one of the seven senior Spanish naval officers on the Spanish side. It was a meeting that got very argumentative with raised voices.

Despite Spanish warnings, Villeneuve in command of the combined fleet, decided to put to sea on 21 October. On leaving port the fleet encountered Nelson's fleet which attacked and began the Battle of Trafalgar. At the battle Rayo was positioned in the rearguard. Due to the weak wind conditions Rayo initially found it difficult to turn to join the battle. Later MacDonnell ignored the orders of the French commodore in charge of the rearguard, and was one of only two ships from the rearguard that turned back to join the centre of battle.

Rayo had four deaths during the battle and its mast was seriously damaged. After the battle at sunset Rayo escaped capture and MacDonnell was the highest ranking Spanish officer to escape the battle uninjured and return to Cadiz.

Trafalgar rescue sortie

On 22 October, the day after the battle, a council of war meeting of senior naval officers was held in Cadiz, where the surviving ships had harbored. At this meeting plans were made on the Spanish flagship  by Admiral Antonio de Escaño who reasoned that the English would find it hard to hold onto the captured ships because of the stormy weather. He ordered a rescue mission to recapture these ships which had thousands of Spanish and French prisoners on board. As the only senior officer remaining, MacDonnell was given command of the rescue squadron along with French commodore Julien Cosmao-Kerguelen

The following morning on 23 October, at 9:30am the mission began and five ships, with support frigates, set out to sea. This mission was to have the appearance of a surprise counter-attack, but the recovery of ships was the objective. The orders were to only engage in battle with ships of similar size if challenged and conditions favored. The English ships at the end of their fleet were forced to release their tow of four ships and form a defensive line. The rescue fleet took control of two of the freed ships and towed them to Cadiz, while the allied crew on two other ships rose up and overpowered the prize crews and sailed away; one ship later grounded on rocks, with the crew rescued, and the other transferring its crew to a supporting ship, then going in that evening's storm. The storm was also to sink two of the original rescue ships, which were damaged and stranded at sea, including Rayo.

The British success in capturing Rayo was short lived as it too foundered shortly after the British prize crew took command. MacDonnell was taken prisoner aboard Donegal. The entire crew was rescued by Cadiz small craft and with prize crew taken prisoner.

The mission was considered a success despite the loss of two rescue ships. Two recaptured ships reached Cadiz safely. and the crew of a third ship were saved. Also, the crews of both rescue ships that sank were also saved.

Most importantly for the Spanish was the recapture of Vice-Admiral Álava's flagship, Santa Ana.

The rescue was a disappointing but unavoidable result for the British. They lost four captured ships, including the 350 cannon on board, and 3,000 prisoners, but crucially 150 of their own men manning the prize ships were captured by the rescue crews. The capture of the prize crews was to prove crucial and forced the British to stay at Trafalgar to negotiate a prisoner swap. MacDonnell, who was on board HMS Donegal, was released in these negotiations a week after the battle. Prisoners on both sides, especially officers, were treated very humanely. MacDonnell was able to write a full report to Admiral Gravina while on board Donegal indicating he was afforded cordial treatment and facilities.

Captured by HMS Donegal

At the time Rayo was captured on 25 October, all three of its masts were broken and it was unable to put up a defensive fight. MacDonnell lowered the Spanish flag to surrender after the first cannon shot, and then threw the ship's secret signals book overboard tied to a cannonball. A prize crew from HMS Donegal, including its master, took control of the nearly crippled Rayo, and MacDonnell was taken prisoner on board Donegal. It coincidentally was the French frigate that Irish revolutionary Wolfe Tone was captured on off the coast of Ireland, having been renamed. Despite the efforts of the British prize crew Rayo foundered on the rocks in the storm with the loss of 25 lives. The remaining Rayo crew and 25 British sailors and officers on board were rescued by small Spanish boats. The master of HMS Donegal recounted an unexpected kindness when he was not allowed to disembark from the small boat in Cadiz until a small cart was reversed into the water, to ensure he could step onto it and thence ashore, so not to get wet. MacDonnell was equally well treated while on board Donegal, and he was released after a week on board. While on that ship he wrote his report to the admiralty. After a week, Captain Henry Blackwood came ashore at Cadiz and both sides exchanged prisoners.

War with France and British alliance
After the Spanish insurrection of Seville in 1808, and the beginning of Spanish war of independence, the Spanish junta in Cadiz rose up against the French. He was appointed by the Supreme Junta of the city as commander of the Spanish fleet. His first task was to sail out to the British fleet under Admiral Collingwood to declare they were about to attack the French and to seek allegiance with Britain. He refused Collingwood's offer of assistance as this would have meant a sharing of the captured French ships after the attack that became known as the Capture of the Rosily Squadron. On his return he had orders to attack the French fleet in the port, assisting the land=based artillery, with five days hostilities ongoing the Spanish refused the British offer of assistance as they watched from sea. The French surrendered. After taking the French ships he was to board the flagship of British admiral John Child Purvis, general commander of the squadron that blockaded the city, trying to cease hostilities between Spain and Great Britain. The matter was satisfactorily resolved, with Admiral Collingwood also coming ashore to negotiate a new Spanish-British alliance. In this he was so successful that the English general Sir John Moore, offered to press for MacDonnell's appointment as the Junta's ambassador in London; but MacDonnell refused saying, "to have accepted a diplomatic post when there was a general call to arms in my country, would not have been in keeping with the dignity and character of a high-ranking officer."

MacDonnell was admitted to the military hospital in Cadiz from June 1815 to June 1816. In 1817 he was promoted to vice-admiral and appointed a Minister of the Supreme Council of the Admiralty. Vice-Admiral Álava, who he helped rescue at Trafalgar, had also just been made an admiral at the Admiralty at that time. The following year, the Supreme Council was abolished.

In 1820 MacDonnell subdued a mutiny in Cadiz.

Illness and death

He returned to Cadiz, where he had to return to enter the hospital there due to illness. He died there on 23 November 1823. His funeral was paid by public subscription indicating a lack of personal funds.

Popular culture
 Rayo was featured on a Cuba stamp in 1989.
Little remains today because the deposit was plundered several times historically.

References

Spanish admirals
1823 deaths
1753 births
People from Pontevedra
Spanish commanders of the Napoleonic Wars